Nazanin Nour (also Romanized as "Nāzanin Nūr") is an Iranian American actress, model and writer. She has appeared on several television films and shows, including Madam Secretary. She is one of the judges of the first season of Persia's Got Talent, the Persian spin-off of the British talent show Got Talent, produced in Stockholm, Sweden.

Personal life
Nazanin Nour was born to Iranian parents in Arlington County, Virginia, United States, and is now based in Los Angeles, California.
She is also a social activist and took over Ellen DeGeneres's Instagram on 1 October 2022 to share stories in solidarity with the Iranian people during Mahsa Amini protests.

References

External links
 

Living people
American film actresses
American people of Iranian descent
Actresses of Iranian descent
American television actresses
Year of birth missing (living people)
21st-century American women